The Penal Laws against Wales were a set of laws, passed by Parliament in 1401 and 1402 that discriminated against the Welsh people as a response to the Welsh Revolt of Owain Glyndŵr, which began in 1400. 

The laws prohibited the Welsh from obtaining senior public office, the bearing of arms or buying property in English boroughs. Public assembly was forbidden, and Englishmen who married Welsh women were also prevented from holding office in Wales.

The laws were reaffirmed in 1431, 1433 and 1471 although were inconsistently applied in practice. They were obsoleted with the Laws in Wales Acts under Henry VIII and finally repealed in 1624.

History
After the Conquest of Wales by Edward I, Wales was divided into the Principality of Wales and various marcher lordships. The 1284 Statute of Rhuddlan, a royal ordinance, established the new arrangement, introducing English common law, but allowing retained Welsh legal practice and custom. In 1294 Madog ap Llywelyn led a revolt against English rule, which was put down in 1295. It was this revolt that led to a second royal ordinance to be issued by Edward I, and this one was, for the first time, clearly discriminatory and general against the Welsh people. In the 1295 ordinance, the Welsh "were not to reside in the English boroughs of Wales, or to bear arms in them, or to conduct trade outside them"

Through the thirteenth century additional prohibitions were added to the 1295 ordinance at various times. These included provisions  that "Welshmen should not acquire English land in Wales without licences; that they should not be allowed to live or purchase land in English towns in Wales or the English border counties; that they should be prohibited from holding assemblies; that they should be excluded from all the major posts of civil and military power in Wales; and that English burgesses should only be tried and convicted in Wales by fellow Englishmen."

The penal statutes 
With the 1400 Welsh Revolt of Owain Glyndŵr, parliament enacted a set of penal statutes, beginning in 1401 and considerably extended in 1402. These statutes codified and broadened these existing discriminatory laws and prohibitions. 

Six acts were passed in 1401:
 No Welshmen, "wholly born in Wales" could purchase lands or tenements within England nor within the Boroughs or English towns of Wales;
 A Welshman could not obtain the privileges of a citizen or burgess in any city or borough or merchant town; could not become a municipal officer, and was forbidden to carry armour in any city or town;
 Where there was a dispute or debt, the English were permitted to arrest any person and seize their property when coming out of Wales, and hold them until the debt was made good;
 If a Welshman committed a felony in England, and fled to Wales, English officials in Wales were directed to execute him, upon a certificate given by the King's Justice;
 The Lords Marchers were to keep "sufficient stuffing and ward" in their castles in Wales in case of riots; and
 No Englishman could be convicted at the suit of any Welshman in Wales, except by the judgment of English justices, or by the judgment of Englishmen residing there.

Nine additional acts were passed in 1402:
 Englishmen were not to be convicted by Welshmen in Wales;
 "No waster, rhymer, minstrel nor vagabond be in any wise sustained in the land of Wales." - This probably directed against the bards who were engaged by Owain Glyndŵr in rousing insurrection;
 Congregations and councils (i.e. meetings) were forbidden unless they were for an evident and necessary cause, or were held by licence of the chief officials of the Lordships;
 Welshmen were not to carry arms without special licence; 
 No food or armour was to be sent into Wales and an English Constable was appointed to prevent and seize such supplies;
 No Welshmen, unless he were a Bishop or Lord, could possess a castle or defend his house;
 No Welshman could hold office in Wales except for bishops;
 All castles and walled towns were to be kept by Englishmen; and
 An Englishman married to any Welshwoman could also not hold office in Wales or its Marches.

Implementation 
These acts were never universally enforced and were introduced as an emergency measure in response to the rebellion. Nevertheless the immediate effect of these appears to have been the opposite of the intention. Rather than coercing the Welsh to obedience, it may have led many  (Welsh nobles) to resort to arms. Meanwhile Welsh labourers, students and nobles were reported to leave England to support the cause.

After the rebellion the statutes often lay dormant as a more peaceful co-existence was rebuilt between English and Welsh in Wales. Nevertheless the existence of the laws meant that they could be appealed to in disputes, to the disadvantage of the Welsh, or indeed to those who married Welsh spouses. Indeed the statutes were reissued in 1431, 1433, 1444 and 1447, at the specific request of English people living in Wales; and it was this perpetual threat of disadvantage that led many of the wealthier or enterprising Welshmen to seek and be granted full English denizenship.

Despite being inconsistently implemented, and widely worked around, the penal laws remained a source of resentment and frustration into the Tudor period. Henry Tudor was born in Pembroke, raised in Raglan and his grandfather hailed from Anglesey. He played up these Welsh connections, even fighting under a banner of a red dragon at the battle of Bosworth Field. On taking the throne, Henry VII broke with convention and also declared himself Prince of Wales, rewarding Welsh supporters thereafter. Through a series of charters the principality and other areas saw the penal laws being abolished, although communities sometimes had to pay considerable sums for these charters. There also remained some doubt about their legal validity. 

The penal statutes were finally superseded under Henry VIII by the Laws in Wales Acts 1535 and 1542. These acts were designed to create a uniformity of law across England and Wales and under them, the Welsh became citizens of the realm, and these acts conferred on them the same rights, freedoms and privileges under the laws of the realm as for English subjects. This was welcomed at the time as putting and end to the discriminatory system. Nevertheless, it was not until 1621, when Welsh MP James Perrot of Pembrokeshire moved a Bill which sought to more systematically remove obsolete acts from the statute books. These included the penal laws, and they were expunged from the statue books in 1624.

Effects 

English and Welsh people "were now formally and legally separated from one another, to the disadvantage of the Welsh, in a way which had not been so before, at least legislatively and on a country-wide basis." The principal effect of the penal laws, whether enforced or not, was to reduce the status of the Welsh to that of second-class citizens in their own land. Davies adds that the laws were possibly more effective as psychological propaganda, rather than in practical application. Moreover these laws led to a rise in lawlessness, exacerbated by semi-independent marcher lordships that "became a byword for murders, ambushes, bribery, corruption, piracy and cattle raids.". There was a growing sense of a denial of social opportunity for the Welsh and governance remained disorganised. 

Anger remained, but the Glyndŵr Welsh Revolt proved to be the last. Hope of a united independent Wales led by a native Welsh prince gradually ended and the laws penalised the Welsh for their rebellion against the English crown. There would be no future national uprising, and all fture rebellions would be based around class rather than national issues.

As well as causing significant ill-feeling among the Welsh people, the laws often restricted nobles in Wales from improving their standing, unable to hold office in their local municipality. Some Welshmen had parliament declare themselves English denizenship so that they were able to achieve higher office or hold land. Although this was not open to all, in everyday life, people were able to overcome racial hierarchy in trade and marriage. Some English nobles intermarried with Welsh women and internalised a Welsh identity, suggesting Wales developed a more complex colonial identity.

Notes

References

Bibliography 

1402 in Wales
Glyndŵr Rising
1400s in law
15th century in Wales
History of Wales
Legal history of Wales
Acts of the Parliament of England
Medieval English law
1402 in England
English criminal law